Giurgiuca is a Romanian surname. Notable people with the surname include:

 Dorin Giurgiuca (1944–2013), Romanian table tennis player and coach
 Emil Giurgiuca (1906–1992), Romanian poet

Romanian-language surnames